Herbster is a census-designated place (CDP) in the Town of Clover in Bayfield County, Wisconsin, United States, located on the south shore of Lake Superior. The primary north/south route is by Lenawee Road / Forest Road 262, leading from Lake Superior to the Chequamegon National Forest. As of the 2010 census, its population was 104.

The Cranberry River joins the lake in the middle of the community. The unique ecosystems of Bark Point and Bark Bay sit just to the east of Herbster.

Herbster's ZIP code is 54844.

History 
According to legend, Herbster was named after a logger, Billy Herbster.

Herbster School closed its doors in 1990, but its historic log gymnasium remains open as a community center and town hall. School children from Herbster now attend school in Port Wing at South Shore School District.

Economy 
Logging remained the force in Herbster's economy throughout the 20th century, driven by the Isaksson family, who still operate the sawmill and remain the largest landowners in the area. Today, service trades and a growing tourist industry have emerged as major players in the Herbster economy.

Herbster has one restaurant at the crossroad of Lenawee Road and Highway 13. There are gift shops along Highway 13. Master cabinetmaker Howard Bowers ran a woodworking shop until his death in 2009.

References

External links
 Community website

Census-designated places in Bayfield County, Wisconsin
Census-designated places in Wisconsin